Ron Morgan (21 December 1931 – 28 March 2013) was  a former Australian rules footballer who played with Fitzroy in the Victorian Football League (VFL).

Notes

External links   
  

  
  
1931 births  
2013 deaths  
Australian rules footballers from Victoria (Australia)  
Fitzroy Football Club players
Morwell Football Club players